Bobby Reynolds and Andy Roddick were the defending champions, but Reynolds did not participate this year.  Roddick partnered Mardy Fish, making it to the quarterfinals before withdrawing from the event.

Juan Martín del Potro and Travis Parrott won the title, defeating Teymuraz Gabashvili and Ivo Karlović 3–6, 6–2, [10–6] in the final. This was Del Potro's first ever ATP title, and as of 2019 his only doubles title.

Seeds

Draw

Draw

External links
 Draw

Doubles